Zhang Qi may refer to:

Zhang Qi (Song dynasty) (died 1048), Chinese official and military general during the Song dynasty
 Zhang Qi, father of Empress Zhang (Hongxi) (d. 1442) of the Ming Dynasty
Zhang Qi (physician) (1922–2019), Chinese physician and professor
Zhang Qi (politician, born 1961), former Party Secretary of Haikou
Zhang Qi (shot putter) (born 1984), Chinese shot putter
Zhang Qi (boccia) (born 1990), Chinese boccia player